Kuberan is a 2000 Tamil language comedy drama film directed by Rama Narayanan and produced by N. Radha. It stars Karthik and Kausalya, while Mantra, Manivannan, Anju, and Thyagu play supporting roles. The music was composed by S. A. Rajkumar.

Plot
Kuberan (Karthik) works as a tour guide in Kodaikanal and is the sole money-earner for a large family, which consists of his good-for-nothing father (Manivannan), the latter's two wives and their children, and Kuberan's sister (Anju) and her unemployed husband (Thyagu). Kavitha (Kausalya), a singer, becomes a new addition to the house when she is cheated off her money by Kuberan's father. Romance blooms between her and Kuberan, and Chandra (Mantra), who also harbors feelings for him, opts out. Kuberan and Kavitha are married, and she too takes part in the sacrifices that he commits for his family.

Cast
 Karthik as Kuberan
 Kausalya as Kavitha
 Mantra as Chandra
 Manivannan as Kuberan's father
 Anju as Thangam, Kuberan's sister
 Thyagu as Kuberan's brother-in-law
 Sindhu as Kuberan's aunt
 Madhan Bob

Soundtrack
Soundtrack was composed by S. A. Rajkumar and lyrics written by Arivumathi and Viveka.

Release
After the film's release, actress Manthra held a press conference to call out director Rama Narayanan for giving her false promises about the length of her role.

References

External links
 Kuberan at oneindia entertainment

2000 films
Indian drama films
2000s Tamil-language films
Films directed by Rama Narayanan
Films scored by S. A. Rajkumar